The Alliance for Change and Transparency, sometimes known as the ACT–Wazalendo, is the third-largest political party in Tanzania. It received its permanent registration in May 2014.

Background
The party was founded in 2014. The party fielded its first presidential candidate in the 2015 general election with Anna Mghwira and won 1 seat in the national assembly. Prominent members of the party are MP Zitto Kabwe, Seif Sharif Hamad, Othman Masoud Sharif, Bernard Membe, Juma Duni Haji, Ismail Jussa, Selemani Bungara, Zahra Ali Hamad, Subeti Khamis Faki, Saleh Nassor Juma, Omar Ali Shehe, Haji Mwadini Makame, Asha Abdu Haji, Nassor Mazrui, Juma Kombo Hamad, Masoud Salim, Ally Saleh, Ali Salim Khamis, Hamadi Maalim, Khalifa Mohammed Issa, Mohamed Juma Khatib, Twahir Awesu Mohammed, Khatib Haji, Haji Kai, Othman Omar Haji, Nassor Omar, Yussuf Salimu Hussein, Abdalla Ali, Yussuf Khamis, Mgeni Jadi Kadika and Abubakar Khamis Bakary. Zitto who formally joined the party in March 2015 following his expulsion from Chadema.

The party got a second boost in March 2019 when Seif Sharif Hamad defected from his party Civic United Front and joined ACT due to a court ruling against control of his previous party.

Election history

Presidential elections

Bunge elections

References

External links

ACT Constitution

2014 establishments in Tanzania
African socialist political parties
Democratic socialist parties in Africa
Political parties established in 2014
Political parties in Tanzania
Socialist parties in Tanzania
Alliance for Change and Transparency politicians